Die for You may refer to:

 "Die for You" (song), a 2016 song by the Weeknd
 Die for You (album), by Antique, 2001
 Die for You (novel), a 2009 novel by Lisa Unger
 "Die for You", a song by Alice Cooper on the 1991 album Hey Stoopid
 "Die for You", a song by Joji from the 2022 album Smithereens
 "Die for You", a song by Justin Bieber featuring Dominic Fike on the 2021 album Justice
 "Die for You", a 2009 song by Kim Petras
 "Die for You", a song by Pennywise on the 2008 album Reason to Believe
 "Die for You", a song by Pentagon on the 2020 album Universe: The Black Hall
 "Die for You", a song by Red on the 2013 album Release the Panic
 "Die for You", a song by Starset from the 2017 album Vessels

See also
 "Die4U", a 2021 song by Bring Me the Horizon
 I Would Die for You (disambiguation)
 Cry for You (disambiguation)